The Eddie Delahoussaye Stakes (often shortened to the "Eddie D") is a Grade II American Thoroughbred horse race for horses aged three years old or older over the distance of about  furlongs on the Downhill Turf course scheduled annually in late September or early October at Santa Anita Park in Arcadia, California.  The event currently carries a purse of $200,000.

History

The event was inaugurated on 30 October 1974 as the Morvich Handicap at the Oak Tree Racing Association meeting at Santa Anita Park as the eighth race on the racecard over a distance of  furlongs on the dirt.

The event was named for Morvich, an American Champion Two-Year-Old Colt who in 1922 became the first California-bred racehorse to win the Kentucky Derby.

The following year the event scheduled for the Downhill Turf course at the distance of about  furlongs.

In 1999 the event was classified as Grade III

In 2010 the Oak Tree Racing Association meeting was held at Hollywood Park Racetrack and the race was shortened to six furlongs.

In 2012, the Morvich Handicap was renamed to the Eddie Delahoussaye Stakes (often shortened to just "Eddie D") in honor of the US Hall of Fame jockey. Eddie Delahoussaye rode the Tsunami Slew to victory in 1984 running of the event.

The event was upgraded to Grade II for the 2019 running. Also that year the event run at the shorter five furlong distance with Santa Anita Administration not holding events on the Downhill Turf course. The event returned back to the Downhill Turf course in 2021.

Records
Speed  record: 
 5 furlongs: 0:55.33 – Pee Wee Reese (2019)
abt.  furlongs: 1:10.93  – Stormy Liberal (2018)

Margins:
 8 lengths – Western Approach (1993)

Most wins:
 3 –  California Flag (2008, 2009, 2011)

Most wins by an owner:
 3 –  Hi Card Ranch  (2008, 2009, 2011)

Most wins by a jockey:
 4 – Kent J. Desormeaux (1991, 1993, 1996, 2005)

Most wins by a trainer:
 6 –  Robert J. Frankel (1977, 1978, 1986, 1993, 1999, 2004)

Winners

Legend:

 
 

Notes:

§ Ran as an entry

ƒ Filly or Mare

† In the 1999 running Kahal (GB) was first past the post but was disqualified and placed second for drifting in the straight and brushing Riviera (FR).

See also
List of American and Canadian Graded races

External links
 2015 Santa Anita Park Media Guide

References

Graded stakes races in the United States
Grade 2 stakes races in the United States
Recurring sporting events established in 1974
Open sprint category horse races
Horse races in California
Turf races in the United States
Sports competitions in Los Angeles County, California
1974 establishments in California